The Vouliagmeni Olympic Centre was the site of the men's and women's triathlon at the 2004 Summer Olympics at Athens, Greece. It also hosted the individual time trial cycling events. Located at Vouliagmeni, south Athens, the temporary facility seated up to 3,600, though only 2,200 seats were publicly available for the event.

References
2004 Summer Olympics official report. Volume 2. pp. 299, 413.

 
Venues of the 2004 Summer Olympics
Sports venues in Athens
Olympic cycling venues
Olympic triathlon venues
Vari-Voula-Vouliagmeni
2004 Summer Paralympics venues
Buildings and structures in East Attica
Defunct sports venues in Greece